Spearman High School is a public high school located in Spearman, Texas (USA) and classified as a 3A school by the UIL. It is part of the Spearman Independent School District located in southeastern Hansford County. In 2015, the school was rated "Met Standard" by the Texas Education Agency.

Athletics
The Spearman Lynx compete in these sports - 

Basketball
Cross Country
Football
Golf
Swimming
Tennis
Track and Field

State Titles
Girls Basketball - 
1966(2A), 1971(2A), 1972(2A), 1977(2A)
Girls Cross Country - 
1988(2A), 2008(2A), 2009(2A), 2010(2A), 2011(2A)
Girls Golf - 
1975(2A)
Girls Track - 
2000(2A)

State Finalist
Girls Basketball - 
1961(2A), 1967(2A), 1969(2A), 1970(2A)

References

External links
Spearman ISD

Public high schools in Texas
Schools in Hansford County, Texas